HMS Ramsey was a  of the British Royal Navy. Like other vessels of the Sandown class, Ramsey was built of glass-reinforced plastic and other non-magnetic materials so that her hull does not trigger naval mines as easily as standard warships.

She was the third vessel of the Royal Navy named after the eponymous town on the Isle of Man.

On 11 March 2009, Ramsey and her sister ship  returned from a -year deployment in the Middle East to their home port at HMNB Clyde. During this time the crews of those ships were rotated on and off with eight different crews based in the UK.  She set sail for another deployment in the Middle East on 11 March 2011.

Ramsey and Blyth were decommissioned in joint ceremony at Rosyth on 4 August 2021. Following a refit by Babcock she will be transferred to the Romanian Navy.

References

External links

Sandown-class minehunters
Ships built in Southampton
1999 ships
Minehunters of the United Kingdom